Glenblair (formerly, Glen Blair Junction) is an unincorporated community in Mendocino County, California.

A post office operated at Glenblair from 1903 to 1928. The name honors the Glen Blair Lumber Company that shipped lumber from the place.

References

Unincorporated communities in California
Unincorporated communities in Mendocino County, California